Marit Slagsvold (born 20 May 1962) is a Norwegian priest in the Church of Norway, sociologist, author and researcher. She is the wife of Jonas Gahr Støre, the Prime Minister of Norway.

Career
Slagsvold earned her magister degree (equal to a PhD in Anglophone countries) in sociology at the University of Oslo in 1991 with a dissertation titled Nyetableringer og nettverk. She was a civil servant in the Ministry of Children and Families from 1991 to 2003, and then became a researcher at Oslo University College where she worked on research on social inclusion. She has published three books on friendship, young people's grief particularly after the loss of a close relative, and social relations.

Shortly after the 2021 Norwegian parliamentary election it was reported that she would be ordained as a priest in the Lutheran state church of Norway, the Church of Norway, by the Bishop of Oslo Kari Veiteberg, on 19 September 2021. She completed studies in theology at MF Norwegian School of Theology, Religion and Society in 2020. Since January 2021 she has worked as a priest in Uranienborg parish.

Personal life
Marit Slagsvold grew up in Oslo and is the daughter of professor of dentistry Olav Kristoffer Slagsvold and Britt (Bitten) Berg-Pettersen. Her maternal grandfather Carl Berg-Pettersen owned the shipyard company Narvik Mekaniske Verksted in Narvik. She married Jonas Gahr Støre in Flosta Church in 1988. They have three sons, who attended Oslo Waldorf School. Her paternal family hails from the farm Slagsvold in Hedmark, and she is a second cousin once removed of the leader of the Centre Party, Trygve Slagsvold Vedum.

Books 
 Jeg blir til i møte med deg: en bok om relasjoner. Cappelen Damm, 2016.
 Ung sorg. Aschehoug 2008.
 Venner for harde livet: skråblikk på moderne vennskap. Aschehoug 2003.

References 

1962 births
Living people
Norwegian sociologists
Norwegian women sociologists
21st-century Norwegian Lutheran clergy
Women Lutheran clergy